1st Itkulovo (Russian: 1-е Иткулово; , 1-se Etqol) is a rural locality (a selo) and the administrative centre of Itkulovsky 1st Selsoviet, Baymaksky District, the Republic of Bashkortostan, Russia. The  population was 926 as of 2010.

Geography 
1st Itkulovo is located 28 km west of Baymak (the district's administrative centre) by road. Buranbayevo is the nearest rural locality.

Ethnicity 
The village is inhabited by Bashkirs.

Streets 
 A. Nigmatullina
 Azamata
 Bairamgulova
 Gagarina
 Z. Validi
 Lenina
 Mira
 Molodezhnaya
 Pobedy
 S. Yulaeva
 Sadovaya
 Yamash

References

External links 
 1st Itkulovo on travellers.ru

Rural localities in Baymaksky District